Piri Reis University (common usage: Piri Reis Maritime University) is a private university founded by the Turkish Maritime Education Foundation in 2008 in Istanbul, Turkey. Named after the Turkish admiral and cartographer Piri Reis (ca. 1470–1554), it is devoted to the education of maritime studies.

Faculties
The university consists of four faculties and two institutes.
Faculty of Science and Letters
Faculty of Economics and Business Administration
Faculty of Engineering
Faculty of Maritime
Institute of Science
Institute of Social Sciences

External links
Piri Reis University official website

Educational institutions established in 2008
Private universities and colleges in Turkey
Universities and colleges in Istanbul
Maritime colleges
Piri Reis
2008 establishments in Turkey
Sultanbeyli
Tuzla, Istanbul